Humberto Martínez Vega (born October 20, 1980, in Guadalajara, Jalisco) is a former professional Mexican footballer who last played for UAT.

External links
Ascenso MX 

1980 births
Living people
Mexican footballers
Correcaminos UAT footballers
Footballers from Guadalajara, Jalisco
Association footballers not categorized by position
21st-century Mexican people